Sua Vida Me Pertence (Portuguese for Your Life Belongs To Me) is a Brazilian pioneering television series known as the first telenovela produced in the country. The show was broadcast in black and white by the now defunct TV Tupi in São Paulo  from 1951 to 1952. The series pioneered the telenovela genre worldwide, and featured Brazil's first live on-screen television kiss in broadcast history between actress Vida Alves and actor Wálter Forster.

Unlike standard soap operas, it concentrated on one primary story line and reached a conclusion after a set number of episodes. In this format, it was an innovation of its age, and was progenitor of the ongoing genre.

The series premiered on December 21, 1951, just over a year since the birth of TV Tupi. It was broadcast live, twice per week, for fifteen episodes, and centred upon the will-they won't-they romance between an attractive young girl, played by Vida Alves, and her lover, played by Wálter Forster, acting as a launch-pad to fame for the latter.

Cast

See also 
 Telenovela

References

Sources 
 https://web.archive.org/web/20070708045446/http://lass.calumet.purdue.edu/cca/gmj/sp03/gmj-sp03-rego.htm

Brazilian telenovelas
1951 telenovelas
1951 Brazilian television series debuts
1952 Brazilian television series endings
1951 in Brazilian television